"Cheap Trick Kinda' Girl" is the fourth single from the Danish dance/house duo Infernal.  Released from their most successful album to date, From Paris to Berlin, in Australia, it was released as the second single and contained "From Paris to Berlin" as a double A-Side.

Track listing
CD single (AUS)
"Cheap Trick Kinda' Girl" [radio edit] – 3:17
"From Paris To Berlin" [radio version] – 3:27
"Cheap Trick Kinda' Girl" [extended version] – 5:56
"From Paris To Berlin" [Dj Aligator Meets Mr. President club mix] – 6:35

Charts

References

Infernal (Danish band) songs
2005 singles
Songs written by Paw Lagermann
Songs written by Lina Rafn
2005 songs